Makeda Lizanna Kefima Antoine-Cambridge (born December 31, 1978) is the ambassador and permanent representative of Trinidad and Tobago to the United Nations.

Antoine-Cambridge earned a Masters of Science from the University of Bradford, and an MBA from Andrews University. In 2013 she founded Genesis International Limited, Trinidad and Tobago. On May 31, 2018, she was appointed as an ambassador of Trinidad and Tobago to the United Nations Office at Vienna.

References

1978 births
Living people
Alumni of the University of Bradford
Andrews University alumni
Permanent Representatives of Trinidad and Tobago to the United Nations